= United Nations General Assembly Resolution 60/285 =

UN United Nations General Assembly 60/285
- Date: 7 September 2006
- Meeting no.: 60th session, 98th plenary meeting
- Code: A/60/285 (Document)
- Subject: The situation in the occupied territories of Azerbaijan
- Voting summary: none voted against; none abstained
- Result: Adopted without a vote

United Nations General Assembly Resolution 60/285 (The situation in the occupied territories of Azerbaijan). By adopting this Resolution, the General Assembly expressed its serious concerns for the environmental damage in the occupied territories of Azerbaijan, and called the organizations and programmes of the United Nations system, in particular, the United Nations Environment Programme to provide all necessary assistance for the rehabilitation of the long-term impact of the environmental degradation of the region.

== Letter from the Permanent Representative of Azerbaijan to the United Nations to the Secretary-General ==
On June 28, 2006, the Ambassador of Azerbaijan to the United Nations addressed a Letter to the Secretary-General. In the Letter, Azerbaijan indicated that towns, villages, agricultural lands, cultural and historical monuments, flora and fauna, and living dwellings in the occupied territories of Azerbaijan have been demolished or set on fire. Azerbaijan annexed satellite photos of the occupied territories to the Letter as proof. In this regard, Azerbaijan accused Armenia of violating international humanitarian law norms, in particular, the Geneva Conventions of 1949 and additional protocols.

== Adoption of the Resolution ==
The Draft Resolution (A/60/L.60/Rev.2) entitled “The situation in the occupied territories of Azerbaijan” was discussed at the 60th session of the General Assembly under Agenda item 40. The Draft Resolution was introduced to the plenary session of the Assembly by the President of Azerbaijan, Ilham Aliyev. The Assembly adopted the Resolution (60/285) without a vote. The representative of Armenia stated that they supported the content of the Resolution, but opposed the title of it.

== Full Text of the Resolution ==
The General Assembly,

Seriously concerned by the fires in the affected territories, which have inflicted widespread environmental damage,

1. Stresses the necessity to urgently conduct an environmental operation to suppress the fires in the affected territories and to overcome their detrimental consequences;
2. Welcomes the readiness of the parties to cooperate to that end, and considers such an operation to be an important confidence-building measure;
3. Takes note of the intention of the Organization for Security and Cooperation in to organize a mission to the region to assess the short- and long-term impact of the fires on the environment as a step in preparation for the environmental operation;
4. Calls upon, in this regard, the organizations and programmes of the United Nations system, in particular the United Nations Environment Programme, in cooperation with the Organization for Security and Cooperation in Europe, to provide all necessary assistance and expertise, including, inter alia, the assessment of and counteraction to the short- and long-term impact of the environmental degradation of the region, as well as in its rehabilitation;
5. Requests the Chairman-in-Office of the Organization for Security and Cooperation in to provide a report on this matter to state members of the General Assembly by 30 April 2007.

98th plenary meeting

7 September 2006
